The 1960 Pau Grand Prix was a Formula Two motor race held on 18 April 1960 at the Pau circuit, in Pau, Pyrénées-Atlantiques, France. The Grand Prix was won by Jack Brabham, driving the Cooper T45. Maurice Trintignant finished second and Olivier Gendebien third.

The race was the third event in the 1960 Formula Two Constructors' Championship and Formula Two Drivers' Championship.

Entries 
All but three cars entered were Coopers. As regular drivers Jo Bonnier and Graham Hill were racing for BRM at Goodwood Circuit, Porsche sent just one car for Olivier Gendebien who was expected to be a front runner. Cooper also sent just a single works car, for Jack Brabham. Amongst the several privately entered Coopers were Ron Flockhart driving for Ken Tyrrell, Maurice Trintignant driving for Centro Sud, and Pau regular Jackie Lewis. There were also two privately entered Lotuses.

Practice 
Near the start of the first practice session, on a drying track, Lewis was fastest with 1 minute 35.8, and Gendebien not far behind. Brabham instead focussed on setup, while Trintignant struggled with poor handling, continuing to change springs and shock absorbers even into the second session. 

Ultimately, in the second session Brabham went fastest on the now dry track with 1 minute 34 seconds, with only Trintignant able to come close. Gendebien was able to set third fastest time but dropped a valve in the process, and was two seconds slower than Brabham.

The final grid had Brabham, Trintignant and Gendebien, followed by Lewis and Flockhart on row two.

Report 
At the start Brabham immediately took the lead, followed by Trintignant, Gendebien, Lewis, Flockhart, John Campbell-Jones, and Masten Gregory. Brabham steadily increased his lead over Trintignant by around a second per lap when on the sixth lap he had a minor accident, clipping a straw bale with his rear wheel causing minor handling damage. This delay allowed Trintignant to catch up, urged on by the partisan French crowd. Trintignant's engine was underpowered compared with Brabham's, but now due to the damage on Brabham's car the two drivers began a nose-to-tail battle which would last the entire race. The two cars were never more than a few lengths apart, but Trintignant was never able to cleanly overtake, only managing to sometimes overlap in his efforts to take the lead.

Behind the two leaders Gendebien steadily fell back, knowing he would not be able to challenge the pace of the two leaders, hoping that their fierce battle would take the two Coopers out. For much of the race Lewis stayed not far behind Gendebien, hoping to eventually overtake depending on how the race progressed. However, on his 26th lap his gear lever broke, forcing him to make two lengthy stops, dropping him to last place although he would eventually be classified a finisher. Behind Gendebien, Flockhart lapped steadily, fast enough to maintain fourth place, but not enough to challenge for third. Campbell-Jones ran fifth for some time but radiator trouble meant he had to make several pitstops, dropping him back and allowing Tony Marsh into fifth ahead of Paul Frère.

The order near the front remained the same for over half the race. Brabham and Trintignant first lapped Gendebien on lap 55, and then on his final lap Brabham was able to lap Gendebien again, who split the lead two cars at the end of the race.

Classification

Race

References

Pau Grand Prix
1960 in French motorsport
Formula Two races